Artūras Andrulis (Americanized his name as Adolfas Andrulis; April 10, 1922 – July 3, 1981) was a soldier and Lithuanian basketball player. He won two gold medals with the Lithuania national basketball team during EuroBasket 1937 and EuroBasket 1939.

Biography
Artūras started playing basketball when he was 17 years old. He studied at Kaunas War School and played in their team. He was notable for fast defense. Later he was invited to Lithuania national basketball team and played as a shooting guard. He won EuroBasket 1937 and EuroBasket 1939.

At the end of World War II he moved to Germany and played for the Kempton Šarūnas, a Lithuanian emigrants' team. Later, he moved to the United States and played for a Lithuanian athletes' club.

References
Footnotes

Bibliography
 Jungtinių Amerikos Valstijų lietuviai. (I t.) – Mokslo ir enciklopedijų leidybos centras, Vilnius, 1998
 Vidas Mačiulis, Vytautas Gudelis. Halė, kurioje žaidė Lubinas ir Sabonis. 1939–1989 – Respublikinis sporto kombinatas, Kaunas, 1989

1922 births
1981 deaths
Lithuanian men's basketball players
Lithuanian emigrants to the United States
FIBA EuroBasket-winning players
Shooting guards
Lithuanian expatriate basketball people in Germany